Ventriloquizzing is the fourth album by Fujiya & Miyagi released in 2011. It is the first album on which the band chose to share producer credits, bringing in Thom Monahan to assist on the project.

Track listing
 "Ventriloquizzing"
 "Sixteen Shades of Black & Blue"
 "Cat Got Your Tongue"
 "Taiwanese Boots"
 "Yoyo"
 "Pills"
 "OK"
 "Minestrone"
 "Spilt Milk"
 "Tinsel & Glitter"
 "Universe"
 "Obstacles" (iTunes Bonus Track)

Release history

References

External links

2011 albums
Fujiya & Miyagi albums
Full Time Hobby albums
Yep Roc Records albums
Albums produced by Thom Monahan